The Climate, Energy and Environmental Aid Guidelines (CEEAG) allow exceptions to the ban on state aid in the European Union (EU), meaning subsidies or other benefits the EU member states or the EU itself grant to companies.

The CEEAG allow state aid to renewable energy, clean mobility, and hydrogen companies, among others. Fossil fuel production cannot receive state aid under the guidelines, except for gas under some circumstances.

Most EU state aid is provided under block exemption, but it can also be provided under state aid exemption guidelines like the CEEAG. To provide state aid under such a guideline, EU member states require the consent of the European Commission, unless the aid falls under a minimum threshold ('de minimis').

The three other members of the European Economic Area (Iceland, Liechtenstein, Norway) request the exemption from the EFTA Surveillance Authority. 

To obtain European Commission approval for aid under the CEEAG, EU member states use a software. The Commission publishes its decisions on its competition website.

History 
The CEEAG replace the Energy and Environmental Aid Guidelines (EEAG) which were in force from 2014 to 2021. The revision process included a public consultation.

Examples of state aid under EEAG/CEEAG 
An example of state aid falling under (C)EEAG is the  German Renewable Energy Sources Act ( in its German abbreviation), a scheme that subsidises renewable power. In April 2021, the Commission rejected some parts of the revision, such as subsidies to nuclear power plants, but approved other aspects of it using EEAG. Such approval included increased subsidies to solar power plants and onshore wind farms. As of 15 December 2021, the Commission still is to consider the approval of other aspects of the German scheme's revision.

References

External links 

 EUR-Lex page: CEEAG

Environmental policy in the EU